Plankton are the diverse collection of organisms found in water (or air) that are unable to propel themselves against a current (or wind). The individual organisms constituting plankton are called plankters. In the ocean, they provide a crucial source of food to many small and large aquatic organisms, such as bivalves, fish and whales.

Marine plankton include bacteria, archaea, algae, protozoa and drifting or floating animals that inhabit the saltwater of oceans and the brackish waters of estuaries. Freshwater plankton are similar to marine plankton, but are found in lakes and rivers. 

Although plankton are usually thought of as inhabiting water, there are also airborne versions that live part of their lives drifting in the atmosphere. These aeroplankton include plant spores, pollen and wind-scattered seeds. They may also include microorganisms swept into the air from terrestrial dust storms and oceanic plankton swept into the air by sea spray.

Though many planktonic species are microscopic in size, plankton includes organisms over a wide range of sizes, including large organisms such as jellyfish. This is because plankton are defined by their ecological niche and level of motility rather than by any phylogenetic or taxonomic classification. Technically, the term does not include organisms on the surface of the water,  called neuston, or those that swim actively in the water, called nekton.

Terminology 

The name plankton was coined by German marine biologist Victor Hensen in 1887 from shortening the word halyplankton from Greek  háls "sea" and  planáō to  "drift" or "wander". While some forms are capable of independent movement and can swim hundreds of meters vertically in a single day (a behavior called diel vertical migration), their horizontal position is primarily determined by the surrounding water movement, and plankton typically flow with ocean currents. This is in contrast to nekton organisms, such as fish, squid and marine mammals, which can swim against the ambient flow and control their position in the environment.

Within the plankton, holoplankton spend their entire life cycle as plankton (e.g. most algae, copepods, salps, and some jellyfish). By contrast, meroplankton are only planktic for part of their lives (usually the larval stage), and then graduate to either a nektic (swimming) or benthic (sea floor) existence. Examples of meroplankton include the larvae of sea urchins, starfish, crustaceans, marine worms, and most fish.

The amount and distribution of plankton depends on available nutrients, the state of water and a large amount of other plankton.

The study of plankton is termed planktology and a planktonic individual is referred to as a plankter. The adjective planktonic is widely used in both the scientific and popular literature, and is a generally accepted term. However, from the standpoint of prescriptive grammar, the less-commonly used planktic is more strictly the correct adjective. When deriving English words from their Greek or Latin roots, the gender-specific ending (in this case, "-on" which indicates the word is neuter) is normally dropped, using only the root of the word in the derivation.

Trophic groups 

Plankton are primarily divided into broad functional (or trophic level) groups:   
Phytoplankton (from Greek phyton, or plant), are autotrophic prokaryotic or eukaryotic algae that live near the water surface where there is sufficient light to support photosynthesis. Among the more important groups are the diatoms, cyanobacteria, dinoflagellates and coccolithophores.
Zooplankton (from Greek zoon, or animal), are small protozoans or metazoans (e.g. crustaceans and other animals) that feed on other plankton. Some of the eggs and larvae of larger nektonic animals, such as fish, crustaceans, and annelids, are included here.
Mycoplankton include fungi and fungus-like organisms, which, like bacterioplankton, are also significant in remineralisation and nutrient cycling.
Bacterioplankton include bacteria and archaea, which play an important role in remineralising organic material down the water column (note that prokaryotic phytoplankton are also bacterioplankton).
Virioplankton are viruses. Viruses are more abundant in the plankton than bacteria and archaea, though much smaller.

Mixoplankton 

Mixotrophs. Plankton have traditionally been categorized as producer, consumer and recycler groups, but some plankton are able to benefit from more than just one trophic level. In this mixed trophic strategy—known as mixotrophy—organisms act as both producers and consumers, either at the same time or switching between modes of nutrition in response to ambient conditions. This makes it possible to use photosynthesis for growth when nutrients and light are abundant, but switching to eat phytoplankton, zooplankton or each other when growing conditions are poor. Mixotrophs are divided into two groups; constitutive mixotrophs, CMs, which are able to perform photosynthesis on their own, and non-constitutive mixotrophs, NCMs, which use phagocytosis to engulf phototrophic prey that are either kept alive inside the host cell which benefit from its photosynthesis, or they digest their prey except for the plastids which continues to perform photosynthesis (kleptoplasty).
Recognition of the importance of mixotrophy as an ecological strategy is increasing, as well as the wider role this may play in marine biogeochemistry. Studies have shown that mixotrophs are much more important for the marine ecology than previously assumed, and comprise more than half of all microscopic plankton. Their presence act as a buffer that prevents the collapse of ecosystems during times with little to no light.

Size groups 

Plankton are also often described in terms of size. Usually the following divisions are used: 
{|
|width="120"| Group
|width="100"| Size range    (ESD)
|width="350"| Examples
|-
| Megaplankton     ||> 20 cm               || metazoans; e.g. jellyfish; ctenophores; salps and pyrosomes (pelagic Tunicata); Cephalopoda; Amphipoda
|-
| Macroplankton    || 2→20 cm            || metazoans; e.g. Pteropoda; Chaetognaths; Euphausiacea (krill); Medusae; ctenophores; salps, doliolids and pyrosomes (pelagic Tunicata); Cephalopoda; Janthina and Recluzia (two genera of gastropods); Amphipoda
|-
| Mesoplankton     || 0.2→20 mm            || metazoans; e.g. copepods; Medusae; Cladocera; Ostracoda; Chaetognaths; Pteropoda; Tunicata
|-
| Microplankton    || 20→200 µm || large eukaryotic protists; most phytoplankton; Protozoa Foraminifera; tintinnids; other ciliates; Rotifera; juvenile metazoans – Crustacea (copepod nauplii)
|-
| Nanoplankton     || 2→20 µm             || small eukaryotic protists; small diatoms; small flagellates; Pyrrophyta; Chrysophyta; Chlorophyta; Xanthophyta
|-
| Picoplankton || 0.2→2 µm            || small eukaryotic protists; bacteria; Chrysophyta
|-
| Femtoplankton    || < 0.2 µm         || marine viruses   
|-
|}
   
However, some of these terms may be used with very different boundaries, especially on the larger end. The existence and importance of nano- and even smaller plankton was only discovered during the 1980s, but they are thought to make up the largest proportion of all plankton in number and diversity.

The microplankton and smaller groups are microorganisms and operate at low Reynolds numbers, where the viscosity of water is more important than its mass or inertia.

Habitat groups

Marine plankton
Marine plankton includes marine bacteria and archaea, algae, protozoa and drifting or floating animals that inhabit the saltwater of oceans and the brackish waters of estuaries.

Freshwater plankton
Freshwater plankton are similar to marine plankton, but are found inland in the freshwaters of lakes and rivers.

Aeroplankton

Aeroplankton are tiny lifeforms that float and drift in the air, carried by the current of the wind; they are the atmospheric analogue to oceanic plankton. Most of the living things that make up aeroplankton are very small to microscopic in size, and many can be difficult to identify because of their tiny size. Scientists can collect them for study in traps and sweep nets from aircraft, kites or balloons. Aeroplankton is made up of numerous microbes, including viruses, about 1000 different species of bacteria, around 40,000 varieties of fungi, and hundreds of species of protists, algae, mosses and liverworts that live some part of their life cycle as aeroplankton, often as spores, pollen, and wind-scattered seeds. Additionally, peripatetic microorganisms are swept into the air from terrestrial dust storms, and an even larger amount of airborne marine microorganisms are propelled high into the atmosphere in sea spray. Aeroplankton deposits hundreds of millions of airborne viruses and tens of millions of bacteria every day on every square meter around the planet.

The sea surface microlayer, compared to the sub-surface waters, contains elevated concentration of bacteria and viruses. These materials can be transferred from the sea-surface to the atmosphere in the form of wind-generated aqueous aerosols due to their high vapour tension and a process known as volatilisation. When airborne, these microbes can be transported long distances to coastal regions. If they hit land they can have an effect on animal, vegetation and human health. Marine aerosols that contain viruses can travel hundreds of kilometers from their source and remain in liquid form as long as the humidity is high enough (over 70%). These aerosols are able to remain suspended in the atmosphere for about 31 days. Evidence suggests that bacteria can remain viable after being transported inland through aerosols. Some reached as far as 200 meters at 30 meters above sea level. The process which transfers this material to the atmosphere causes further enrichment in both bacteria and viruses in comparison to either the SML or sub-surface waters (up to three orders of magnitude in some locations).

Geoplankton

Many animals live in terrestrial environments by thriving in transient often microscopic bodies of water and moisture, these include rotifers and gastrotrichs which lay resilient eggs capable of surviving years in dry environments, and some of which can go dormant themselves. Nematodes are usually microscopic with this lifestyle. Water bears, despite only having lifespans of a few months, famously can enter suspended animation during dry or hostile conditions and survive for decades. This allows them to be ubiquitous in terrestrial environments despite needing water to grow and reproduce. Many microscopic crustacean groups like copepods and amphipods (of which sandhoppers are members) and seed shrimp are known to go dormant when dry and live in transient bodies of water too

Other groups

Gelatinous zooplankton

Gelatinous zooplankton are fragile animals that live in the water column in the ocean. Their delicate bodies have no hard parts and are easily damaged or destroyed. Gelatinous zooplankton are often transparent. All jellyfish are gelatinous zooplankton, but not all gelatinous zooplankton are jellyfish. The most commonly encountered organisms include ctenophores, medusae, salps, and Chaetognatha in coastal waters. However, almost all marine phyla, including Annelida, Mollusca and Arthropoda, contain gelatinous species, but many of those odd species live in the open ocean and the deep sea and are less available to the casual ocean observer.

Ichthyoplankton

Ichthyoplankton are the eggs and larvae of fish. They are mostly found in the sunlit zone of the water column, less than 200 metres deep, which is sometimes called the epipelagic or photic zone. Ichthyoplankton are planktonic, meaning they cannot swim effectively under their own power, but must drift with the ocean currents. Fish eggs cannot swim at all, and are unambiguously planktonic. Early stage larvae swim poorly, but later stage larvae swim better and cease to be planktonic as they grow into juveniles. Fish larvae are part of the zooplankton that eat smaller plankton, while fish eggs carry their own food supply. Both eggs and larvae are themselves eaten by larger animals. Fish can produce high numbers of eggs which are often released into the open water column. The newly hatched young of oviparous fish are called larvae. They are usually poorly formed, carry a large yolk sac (for nourishment) and are very different in appearance from juvenile and adult specimens. The larval period in oviparous fish is relatively short (usually only several weeks), and larvae rapidly grow and change appearance and structure (a process termed metamorphosis) to become juveniles. During this transition larvae must switch from their yolk sac to feeding on zooplankton prey, a process which depends on typically inadequate zooplankton density, starving many larvae. In time fish larvae become able to swim against currents, at which point they cease to be plankton and become juvenile fish.

Holoplankton

Holoplankton are organisms that are planktic for their entire life cycle. Holoplankton can be contrasted with meroplankton, which are planktic organisms that spend part of their life cycle in the benthic zone. Examples of holoplankton include some diatoms, radiolarians, some dinoflagellates, foraminifera, amphipods, krill, copepods, and salps, as well as some gastropod mollusk species. Holoplankton dwell in the pelagic zone as opposed to the benthic zone. Holoplankton include both phytoplankton and zooplankton and vary in size. The most common plankton are protists.

Meroplankton

Meroplankton are a wide variety of aquatic organisms which have both planktonic and benthic stages in their life cycles. Much of the meroplankton consists of larval stages of larger organism. Meroplankton can be contrasted with holoplankton, which are planktonic organisms that stay in the pelagic zone as plankton throughout their entire life cycle. After a period of time in the plankton, many meroplankton graduate to the nekton or adopt a benthic (often sessile) lifestyle on the seafloor. The larval stages of benthic invertebrates make up a significant proportion of planktonic communities. The planktonic larval stage is particularly crucial to many benthic invertebrate in order to disperse their young. Depending on the particular species and the environmental conditions, larval or juvenile-stage meroplankton may remain in the pelagic zone for durations ranging from hour to months.

Pseudoplankton

Pseudoplankton are organisms that attach themselves to planktonic organisms or other floating objects, such as drifting wood, buoyant shells of organisms such as Spirula, or man-made flotsam. Examples include goose barnacles and the bryozoan Jellyella. By themselves these animals cannot float, which contrasts them with true planktonic organisms, such as Velella and the Portuguese Man o' War, which are buoyant. Pseudoplankton are often found in the guts of filtering zooplankters.

Tychoplankton

Tychoplankton are organisms, such as free-living or attached benthic organisms and other non-planktonic organisms, that are carried into the plankton through a disturbance of their benthic habitat, or by winds and currents. This can occur by direct turbulence or by disruption of the substrate and subsequent entrainment in the water column. Tychoplankton are, therefore, a primary subdivision for sorting planktonic organisms by duration of lifecycle spent in the plankton, as neither their entire lives nor particular reproductive portions are confined to planktonic existence. Tychoplankton are sometimes called accidental plankton.

Mineralized plankton

Distribution 

Apart from aeroplankton, plankton inhabits oceans, seas, lakes and ponds. Local abundance varies horizontally, vertically and seasonally. The primary cause of this variability is the availability of light. All plankton ecosystems are driven by the input of solar energy (but see chemosynthesis), confining primary production to surface waters, and to geographical regions and seasons having abundant light.

A secondary variable is nutrient availability. Although large areas of the tropical and sub-tropical oceans have abundant light, they experience relatively low primary production because they offer limited nutrients such as nitrate, phosphate and silicate. This results from large-scale ocean circulation and water column stratification. In such regions, primary production usually occurs at greater depth, although at a reduced level (because of reduced light).

Despite significant macronutrient concentrations, some ocean regions are unproductive (so-called HNLC regions). The micronutrient iron is deficient in these regions, and adding it can lead to the formation of phytoplankton algal blooms. Iron primarily reaches the ocean through the deposition of dust on the sea surface. Paradoxically, oceanic areas adjacent to unproductive, arid land thus typically have abundant phytoplankton (e.g., the eastern Atlantic Ocean, where trade winds bring dust from the Sahara Desert in north Africa).

While plankton are most abundant in surface waters, they live throughout the water column. At depths where no primary production occurs, zooplankton and bacterioplankton instead consume organic material sinking from more productive surface waters above. This flux of sinking material, so-called marine snow, can be especially high following the termination of spring blooms.

The local distribution of plankton can be affected by wind-driven Langmuir circulation and the biological effects of this physical process.

Ecological significance

Food chain

Aside from representing the bottom few levels of a food chain that supports commercially important fisheries, plankton ecosystems play a role in the biogeochemical cycles of many important chemical elements, including the ocean's carbon cycle. Fish larvae mainly eat zooplankton, which in turn eat phytoplankton

Carbon cycle

Primarily by grazing on phytoplankton, zooplankton provide carbon to the planktic foodweb, either respiring it to provide metabolic energy, or upon death as biomass or detritus. Organic material tends to be denser than seawater, so it sinks into open ocean ecosystems away from the coastlines, transporting carbon along with it. This process, called the biological pump, is one reason that oceans constitute the largest carbon sink on Earth. However, it has been shown to be influenced by increments of temperature. In 2019, a study indicated that at ongoing rates of seawater acidification, Antarctic phytoplanktons could become smaller and less effective at storing carbon before the end of the century.

It might be possible to increase the ocean's uptake of carbon dioxide generated through human activities by increasing plankton production through iron fertilization – introducing amounts of iron into the ocean. However, this technique may not be practical at a large scale. Ocean oxygen depletion and resultant methane production (caused by the excess production remineralising at depth) is one potential drawback.

Oxygen production

Phytoplankton absorb energy from the Sun and nutrients from the water to produce their own nourishment or energy. In the process of photosynthesis, phytoplankton release molecular oxygen into the water as a waste byproduct. It is estimated that about 50% of the world's oxygen is produced via phytoplankton photosynthesis. The rest is produced via photosynthesis on land by plants. Furthermore, phytoplankton photosynthesis has controlled the atmospheric / balance since the early Precambrian Eon.

Absorption efficiency

The absorption efficiency (AE) of plankton is the proportion of food absorbed by the plankton that determines how available the consumed organic materials are in meeting the required physiological demands. Depending on the feeding rate and prey composition, variations in absorption efficiency may lead to variations in fecal pellet production, and thus regulates how much organic material is recycled back to the marine environment. Low feeding rates typically lead to high absorption efficiency and small, dense pellets, while high feeding rates typically lead to low absorption efficiency and larger pellets with more organic content. Another contributing factor to dissolved organic matter (DOM) release is respiration rate. Physical factors such as oxygen availability, pH, and light conditions may affect overall oxygen consumption and how much carbon is loss from zooplankton in the form of respired . The relative sizes of zooplankton and prey also mediate how much carbon is released via sloppy feeding. Smaller prey are ingested whole, whereas larger prey may be fed on more “sloppily”, that is more biomatter is released through inefficient consumption. There is also evidence that diet composition can impact nutrient release, with carnivorous diets releasing more dissolved organic carbon (DOC) and ammonium than omnivorous diets.

Biomass variability
The growth of phytoplankton populations is dependent on light levels and nutrient availability. The chief factor limiting growth varies from region to region in the world's oceans. On a broad scale, growth of phytoplankton in the oligotrophic tropical and subtropical gyres is generally limited by nutrient supply, while light often limits phytoplankton growth in subarctic gyres. Environmental variability at multiple scales influences the nutrient and light available for phytoplankton, and as these organisms form the base of the marine food web, this variability in phytoplankton growth influences higher trophic levels. For example, at interannual scales phytoplankton levels temporarily plummet during El Niño periods, influencing populations of zooplankton, fishes, sea birds, and marine mammals.

The effects of anthropogenic warming on the global population of phytoplankton is an area of active research. Changes in the vertical stratification of the water column, the rate of temperature-dependent biological reactions, and the atmospheric supply of nutrients are expected to have important impacts on future phytoplankton productivity. Additionally, changes in the mortality of phytoplankton due to rates of zooplankton grazing may be significant.

Plankton diversity

Planktonic Relationships 
Fish & plankton

Zooplankton are the initial prey item for almost all fish larvae as they switch from their yolk sacs to external feeding. Fish rely on the density and distribution of zooplankton to match that of new larvae, which can otherwise starve. Natural factors (e.g., current variations, temperature changes) and man-made factors (e.g. river dams, ocean acidification, rising temperatures) can strongly affect zooplankton, which can in turn strongly affect larval survival, and therefore breeding success.

It's been shown that plankton can be patchy in marine environments where there aren't significant fish populations and additionally, where fish are abundant, zooplankton dynamics are influenced by the fish predation rate in their environment. Depending on the predation rate, they could express regular or chaotic behavior.

A negative effect that fish larvae can have on planktonic algal blooms is that the larvae will prolong the blooming event by diminishing available zooplankton numbers; this in turn permits excessive phytoplankton growth allowing the bloom to flourish .

The importance of both phytoplankton and zooplankton is also well-recognized in extensive and semi-intensive pond fish farming. Plankton population-based pond management strategies for fish rearing have been practiced by traditional fish farmers for decades, illustrating the importance of plankton even in man-made environments.

Whales & plankton

Of all animal fecal matter, it is whale feces that is the 'trophy' in terms of increasing nutrient availability. Phytoplankton are the powerhouse of open ocean primary production and they can acquire many nutrients from whale feces. In the marine food web, phytoplankton are at the base of the food web and are consumed by zooplankton & krill, which are preyed upon by larger and larger marine organisms, including whales, so it can be said that whale poop fuels the entire food web.

Humans & plankton 
Plankton have many direct and indirect effects on humans.

Around 70% of the oxygen in the atmosphere is produced in the oceans from phytoplankton performing photosynthesis, meaning that the majority of the oxygen available for us and other organisms that respire aerobically is produced by plankton.

Plankton also make up the base of the marine food web, providing food for all the trophic levels above. Recent studies have analyzed the marine food web to see if the system runs on a top-down or bottom-up approach. Essentially, this research is focused on understanding whether changes in the food web are driven by nutrients at the bottom of the food web or predators at the top. The general conclusion is that the bottom-up approach seemed to be more predictive of food web behavior. This indicates that plankton have more sway in determining the success of the primary consumer species that prey on them than do the secondary consumers that prey on the primary consumers.

In some cases, plankton act as an intermediate host for deadly parasites in humans. One such case is that of cholera, an infection caused by several strains of Vibrio cholerae. These species have been shown to have a symbiotic relationship with chitinous zooplankton species like copepods. These bacteria benefit not only from the food provided by the chiton from the zooplankton, but also from the protection from acidic environments. Once the copepods have been ingested by a human host, the chitinous exterior protects the bacteria from the stomach acids in the stomach and proceed to the intestines. Once there, the bacteria bind with the surface of the small intestine and the host will start developing symptoms, including extreme diarrhea, within five days.

See also 
 Aeroplankton
 Gelatinous zooplankton
 Ichthyoplankton
 Nekton
 Paradox of the plankton
 Seston
 Veliger

References

Further reading
Kirby, Richard R. (2010). Ocean Drifters: A Secret World Beneath the Waves. Studio Cactus Ltd, UK. .
Dusenbery, David B. (2009). Living at Micro Scale: The Unexpected Physics of Being Small. Harvard University Press, Cambridge, Massachusetts .
Kiørboe, Thomas (2008). A Mechanistic Approach to Plankton Ecology. Princeton University Press, Princeton, N.J. .
Dolan, J.R., Agatha, S., Coats, D.W., Montagnes, D.J.S., Stocker, D.K., eds. (2013).Biology and Ecology of Tintinnid Ciliates: Models for Marine Plankton. Wiley-Blackwell, Oxford, UK .

External links 

 Ocean Drifters – Short film narrated by David Attenborough about the varied roles of plankton
 Plankton Chronicles  – Short documentary films and photos
 COPEPOD: The Global Plankton Database – Global coverage database of zooplankton biomass and abundance data
 Plankton*Net – Taxonomic database of images of plankton species
 Guide to the marine zooplankton of south eastern Australia – Tasmanian Aquaculture and Fisheries Institute
 Sir Alister Hardy Foundation for Ocean Science – Continuous Plankton Recorder Survey
 Australian Continuous Plankton Recorder Project – Integrated Marine Observing System
 Sea Drifters – BBC Audio slideshow
  – Images of planktonic microorganisms
 Plankton, planktic, planktonic – Essays on nomenclature
 Journal of Plankton Research – Scientific periodical devoted to plankton

 
Biological oceanography
 
Aquatic ecology
Oceanographical terminology